A water biscuit or water cracker is a type of savoury cracker. They are thin, hard and brittle, and usually served with cheese or wine. Originally produced in the 19th century as a version of the ship's biscuit, water biscuits continue to be popular in Australia, New Zealand, South Africa, Ireland, and the United Kingdom, with the leading brands (Carr's and Jacob's) selling over seventy million packets a year.

In 1801, Josiah Bent began a baking operation in Milton, Massachusetts, selling "water crackers" or biscuits made of flour and water that would not deteriorate during long sea voyages from the port of Boston. His company later sold the original hardtack crackers used by troops during the American Civil War. These were commercial versions/refinements of the hardtack biscuits which had long been used by the British Royal Navy and other European navies.

Several versions of water crackers exist in ex-British colonies, such as Jamaica, where Excelsior brand water biscuits are a popular breakfast and snack staple. They are often served with a spread, including a spicy pepper-and-herring paste called Solomon Gundy.

See also

 Cream cracker
 Saltine cracker
 Cracker (food)
 Matzo
 Hardtack

References

Biscuits

es:Galletitas de agua